The New England Fuel Institute (or NEFI) is a regional business and trade association headquartered in Southborough, Massachusetts that represents the home heating fuels industry in greater New England. Established in 1950, NEFI represents approximately 1,500 dealers and marketers of heating oil and biofuels for home heating applications (such as bioheat). According to the association's statements, a majority of its member companies are classified as small businesses. NEFI membership also includes heating oil and biofuel transporters and wholesalers, equipment and additive manufacturers, service technicians and other related services companies.

The association offers an array of member services, including: technical and business training courses; industry trade shows, conferences and seminars; publications including a monthly trade magazine and weekly electronic newsletter; group insurance benefits; regulatory compliance resources; and an in-house grassroots public policy action center.

External links 
 Official web site

Lexington, Massachusetts
Heating oil
Trade associations based in the United States